Young Hercules is a prequel series to the television series Hercules: The Legendary Journeys the originally aired on Fox Kids Network. It premiered on September 12, 1998 and ended on May 14, 1999, with a total of 50 episodes over the course of 1 season. It stars Ryan Gosling in the title role. The series was based on Heracles.

Plot

The show features the efforts of Ares, the god of war, played by Kevin Tod Smith, who attempts often to destroy his younger half-brother to win over Zeus' good graces. Among his group is his nephew Strife (Joel Tobeck), who is the rather weaker member of the team. Strife's mother is Discord, goddess of retribution (Meighan Desmond), who acts more level-headed and power hungry than her counterpart on more than one occasion. The series has two other villains: Hera, queen of the gods and Hercules' stepmother; and Apollo, god of the sun and Hercules' half-brother.

The series follows Hercules (Ryan Gosling) as he attends Cheiron's Academy to train in the arts of the warrior under the wise headmaster Cheiron the Centaur (Nathaniel Lees). He makes friends with the future king of Corinth, Prince Jason (Chris Conrad) and a thieving former member of a bandit group named Iolaus (Dean O'Gorman), who was sentenced to train at the academy as an alternative to prison for his crimes. Hercules also meets the academy's first female cadet, Lilith (Jodie Rimmer). Other characters of interest include Kora, the innkeeper who (unknown to Hercules and his friends) is a devotee of Artemis, Goddess of the Hunt. As the series develops, Kora is revealed to have special powers which allow her to do Artemis' bidding. There are hints of romance between Hercules and Kora, although their friendship keeps it all innocent.

Cast

Main
 Ryan Gosling as Hercules
 Dean O'Gorman as Iolaus 
 Chris Conrad as Jason

Supporting
 Jodie Rimmer as Lilith
 Mfundo Morrison as Theseus
 Nathaniel Lees as Cheiron
 Angela Marie Dotchin as Kora
 Kevin Smith as Ares
 Joel Tobeck as Strife
 Meighan Desmond as Discord
 Katrina Browne as Cyane, an Amazon
 Jason Hoyte as Hephaestus, god of metallurgy
 Sharon Tyrell as Alcmene
 Alison Bruce as Simula
 Elizabeth Hawthorne as Hera
 Jay Ryan as Cadet
 John Bach as Zeus

Production
Young Hercules''' executive producers were Robert Tapert and Sam Raimi. Liz Friedman and Eric Gruendemann were co-executive producers, and former MTV producer Cynthia Hsiung was producer of the series. Eric Lewald and Julia Lewald were head writers. In New Zealand, where principal photography was shot, Janine Dickins held down the fort as the New Zealand producer while three series directors took turns shooting the episodes in blocks of four along with a fourth director for second unit. Chris Graves, Charlie Haskell and Andrew Merrifield shot principal photography and Simon Rabbi shot second unit. Later in the series, Simon Rabbi shot principal photography for the 50th episode, "Valley of the Shadow."

The series has been used in case studies of how to shoot television series efficiently. Traditional television series are shot one episode at a time. Young Hercules was shot in blocks of four episodes at a time. The three main directors of the series were on a rotation, one director for each four episode block. The four would be written with this in mind, keeping sets, locations, and actors similar in all four episodes even if story and plot lines might not interrelate. This saved tremendous amounts of money and time allowing the series to be shot on a shoestring budget, but with maximum on-screen dollars. The 50 episodes had a budget of roughly $20 million which includes above and below the line costs. Shooting in New Zealand also allowed the series to circumvent considerable Guild regulations for further savings. Additional money was saved shooting the series on 16 mm film. Early research was done to see if digital cameras could be used, but it was determined that technology was not adequate at the time to make digital filming economically viable.

Principal photography took place in New Zealand while post-production elements including visual effects and music were all edited and integrated together in Los Angeles. Ian Bohen played Young Hercules in the pilot movie and was offered the part, but opted not to move to New Zealand where the series would shoot principal photography. Early on in the series, special visual effects were conceived by Richard Taylor's Weta Workshop, the then little known visual effects company that went on to win several Academy Awards for their work on The Lord of the Rings. Weta and Richard Taylor stepped off Young Hercules early on to work on Lord of the Rings. In fact, the early production days of Young Hercules saw many of its crew leave to work on the then little known Peter Jackson sensation, Lord of the Rings.

Ryan Gosling was only 17 when he was cast in the lead role. To train for the role, Ryan took intense martial arts classes by the same trainer who taught Lucy Lawless and Kevin Sorbo. He was so tall and thin that his costume had to be reworked to minimize the look of how thin he was. Original costume sketches showed a darker upper body costume. When Gosling was cast, the costume designers made the upper body of his costume lighter in color and broader in the chest to help create a more bulky look. Makeup was used on Gosling's arms to help add muscle contours. Similar tricks were used for both Sorbo and Lawless for their characters.

It was known to be only superficially faithful to Greek mythology, as was its predecessor; it uses similar characters, but in a variety of stories, some of which contain anachronisms.

Location
The series was filmed entirely in New Zealand.

Episodes
The series was aired out of order. The episodes are listed below, as presented on DVD, in the order of their production codes. Despite this, the episodes list is not completely correct chronologically. For example, in "The Head That Wears the Crown" Jason is crowned king, yet in several following episodes, such as "Winner Take All", he is still a prince. Similarly, even though Lilith visits Hercules' mother in "Mommy Dearests", they later appear to meet for the first time in "Home for the Holidays".

Reception
The series aired on the Fox Kids Network at first on Monday through Friday at 4:30 p.m. PST and Saturday mornings at 8:30 a.m. PST. Later in the year, the series aired Monday through Friday only at 3:30 p.m. PST. Although ratings on Fox Kids were strong for the season (2nd top-rated live-action series below Power Rangers), Young Hercules was not renewed.

Awards
Daytime Emmy Award

Writers Guild of America Award

Home media
On June 23, 2015, Shout! Factory released Young Hercules- The Complete Series'' on DVD in Region 1 for the very first time.

References

External links
 

1990s American children's television series
1990s New Zealand television series
1998 American television series debuts
1998 New Zealand television series debuts
1999 American television series endings
1999 New Zealand television series endings
Action Pack (TV programming block)
American children's action television series
American children's adventure television series
American children's fantasy television series
American prequel television series
English-language television shows
Fox Kids
Hercules: The Legendary Journeys
New Zealand children's television series
New Zealand fantasy television series
New Zealand science fiction television series
Superheroes
Teen superhero television series
Television series about Heracles
Television series about teenagers
Television series based on classical mythology
Television series by Universal Television
Television series created by Sam Raimi
Television series set in ancient Greece
Television shows filmed in New Zealand
Works by Alex Kurtzman and Roberto Orci
Cultural depictions of Jason